"Sweet Surrender" is the first single from British band Wet Wet Wet's third studio album, Holding Back the River (1989). It was released on 18 September 1989 and reached number six on the UK Singles Chart. In Ireland, "Sweet Surrender" peaked at number one, becoming the group's second of three number-one singles there. In Australia, "Sweet Surrender" reached number seven on the ARIA Singles Chart in May 1990 and was certified gold.

Marti Pellow recorded his own version of the song for inclusion on his 2002 album Marti Pellow Sings the Hits of Wet Wet Wet & Smile. For that version, he changed the lyric from "Hey, little fella, now your show's together" to "Hey, little fella, now your shit's together".

Music video
The music video features the band performing in a dark blue background with a smiling Marti Pellow singing the song and various women dressed in red Arabian clothing swimming in midair.

Track listings
 7-inch, cassette, and mini-CD single
 "Sweet Surrender"
 "This Time" (live at the Govan Town Hall, Glasgow, 15 November 1988)

 12-inch single
A1. "Sweet Surrender" (extended mix)
B1. "This Time" (live at the Govan Town Hall, Glasgow, 15 November 1988)
B2. "H.T.H.D.T.G.T."

 CD single
 "Sweet Surrender"
 "This Time" (live at the Govan Town Hall, Glasgow, 15 November 1988)
 "H.T.H.D.T.G.T."
 "Sweet Surrender" (extended version)

Charts

Weekly charts

Year-end charts

Certifications

References

Wet Wet Wet songs
1989 singles
1989 songs
Mercury Records singles
Songs written by Graeme Clark (musician)
Songs written by Marti Pellow
Songs written by Neil Mitchell (musician)
Songs written by Tommy Cunningham